Adlane Messelem is an Algerian football manager who was last contracted to Sabah FA in Malaysia.

Career

Part of RC Lens' backroom staff from 2005 until 2007, Messelem worked as a football negotiator for five years before being hired as technical director of Singaporean club Home United in 2014. But, towards the expiration of his contract there, he and former footballer Tan Kim Leng exchanged defamatory remarks on Facebook after the latter questioned him about his previous coaching qualifications  which led to an investigation on whether Messelem had the statutory coaching requirements. Eventually, the Algerian divulged that he actually never had any basic coaching qualifications and left in 2016 after his contract ended. In January 2017, Messelem was named as Sabah FA's sporting director for the 2017 Malaysia Premier League season and sought to put discipline into his players. He also had plans to start a youth development program for the club and brought in Jonathan Behe, Soufiane Choubani, and Masaya Jitozono to fill the foreign players' slots. With a record of 7 games and 6 straight defeats, the team manager resigned the Malaysian outfit by March 19, eight weeks after joining them.

References

External links
 

Year of birth missing (living people)
Living people
Algerian football managers
Algerian expatriates in Malaysia
Algerian expatriates in Singapore
Expatriate football managers in Singapore
Expatriate football managers in Malaysia
French sportspeople of Algerian descent
Home United FC